George A. Schroeder was a Democratic member of the Michigan House of Representatives from 1933 through 1938. He served as Speaker of the House during the 58th and 59th Legislatures.

Born to Christian and Fredericka Schroeder in February 1894, George Schroeder was educated in both public and parochial schools in Detroit. He worked for the Packard Motor Car Company as an engineer for ten years.

Elected to the House in 1932, Schroeder was a supporter of Governor Frank Murphy and the New Deal. He was re-elected twice and served as Speaker for his final four years in the House.

Schroeder was an unsuccessful candidate for lieutenant governor in 1938 and became the manager of the Rural Electrification Administration in Ubly.

References

1894 births
1943 deaths
Politicians from Detroit
Speakers of the Michigan House of Representatives
Democratic Party members of the Michigan House of Representatives
20th-century American politicians